Antoine Joseph Monneron (8 May 1736, Antibes – 29 July 1815, Santiago de Cuba) was a French merchant and businessman. A member of the Monneron family, he was active in the West Indies.

1736 births
1815 deaths
French businesspeople